Julia Wilbur (August 8, 1815 – June 6, 1895) was a Quaker abolitionist and suffragist. She kept a diary during the Civil War and in it she records events of historical significance as well as everyday happenings that provide a picture into life during that time. She is noted to have worked alongside Susan B. Anthony to establish voting rights for women. She was an early member and later secretary of the Rochester Ladies' Anti-Slavery Society (RLASS), which helped fund Frederick Douglass' newspaper.

Early life and education 
Julia Ann Wilbur was born on August 8, 1815 in Milan, New York, the third child of Stephen Wilbur and Mary Lapham. She attended Nine Partners Boarding School in Dutchess County, New York from 1829 to 1831. Her mother died in 1835 and her father soon after remarried. She remained at home helping to raise her siblings before she moved to Rochester, New York in 1844 to become a teacher.

Civil War 

In 1862, the RLASS asked Wilbur if she were interested in working to help "contrabands": that is, the men, women, and children who escaped slavery by crossing into Union-occupied territory. She recorded in her diary the original request: "a teacher to go South & are inquiring for me." She agreed and traveled to Washington in October of that year, originally planning to stay in the nation's capital. However, officers of a group called the National Freedmen's Relief Association urged her to move across the river to Alexandria, Virginia, which the Union Army had entered at the start of the war, and to work as a relief agent, rather than a teacher.

Wilbur agreed, and worked in Alexandria from November 1862 to February 1865. Among other efforts, she advocated for better housing and health care for freedpeople. She solicited clothing and other supplies from groups up north, which she distributed from a makeshift "clothing room" in an occupied house on Washington Street. In so doing, she worked with and became lifelong friends with Harriet Jacobs, who moved to Alexandria in January 1863.

Reconstruction 

After the war ended, Wilbur worked for the Freedmen's Bureau, still mostly funded by the RLASS. In this capacity, she served as what was called a visiting agent, distributing tickets to exchange for fuel, food, and other necessities. She not only lamented that the needs far outstripped the available aid, but also recognized that public opinion was turning against Reconstruction efforts. She also made several trips to Richmond and Fredericksburg to provide supplies and to witness and report on conditions for formerly enslaved populations.

Suffrage efforts 

Before the war, Wilbur spent more time in abolition than woman's rights activities, although always strongly supported economic, social, and political rights for women. In 1869, she planned with five other women to register to vote in local elections in Washington. They presented a letter to election judges that read, in part, "We know that it is unusual for those of our sex to make such a request. We do so because we believe ourselves entitled to the franchise." Although the judges refused the request, their effort was covered in the press.

Later years 

Realizing that work with the Freedmen's Bureau was winding down, Wilbur sought a job with the federal government, a member of the first generation of female government workers. She succeeded in obtaining a job as a clerk in the Patent Office, where she worked until she was almost 80 years old. Her obituary reported that she died of "influenza and results" and noted "for many years she engaged in active partisan labor for the cause of freedom." She is buried in her family's plot in Avon, New York.

External links
  Julia Wilbur papers,  Collection Identifier: HC.MC-1158,  Haverford College Quaker & Special Collections, Haverford College
Rochester Ladies' Anti-Slavery Society Papers at the William L. Clements Library
Much of Julia Wilbur's papers have been digitized and are available at the In Her Own Right project

References

1815 births
1895 deaths
American suffragists
American abolitionists
American Civil War nurses
American women nurses
American Quakers
Activists from Rochester, New York
People from Washington, D.C.
American diarists
Women diarists
Quaker abolitionists
Quaker feminists
Women civil rights activists
19th-century diarists